Bonnots Mill Historic District is a national historic district located at Bonnots Mill, Osage County, Missouri.  It encompasses 98 contributing buildings in the central business district and surrounding residential sections of Bonnots Mill.  The district developed between about 1840 and 1942, and includes representative examples of Bungalow / American Craftsman and I-house architecture.  Located in the district is the separately listed Dauphine Hotel.  Other notable buildings include the Bonnots Mill School (1889), Henry Dieckriede House (c. 1885), Bonnots Mill United Methodist Church (1915), Bank of Bonnots Mill (1907), Bonnet's Mill Hotel / Krautman's Store (c. 1870), Meyer-Morfeld Milling Company (c. 1890), United States Post Office (c. 1910), St. Louis Parish Church and Rectory (1907), and St. Louis Parish School (c. 1916).

It was listed on the National Register of Historic Places in 1993.

References 

Historic districts on the National Register of Historic Places in Missouri
Bungalow architecture in Missouri
Buildings and structures in Osage County, Missouri
National Register of Historic Places in Osage County, Missouri